Chakma or Changma is an Indian and Bangladeshi surname that may refer to

Tridev Roy, The 50th Chakma Raja (King) of Bangladesh.
Manabendra Narayan Larma, A Jumma Chakma Politician Bangladesh and a founding Leader of "Parbatya Chattagram Jana Samhati Samiti"(United People's Party of Chittagong Hill Tracts) Bangladesh.
 Chakma people, an ethnic group from the east of the Indian subcontinent
 Amit Chakma, Vice-Chancellor of the University of Western Australia since July 2020
 Santana Chakma, a politician from Tripura, India.
 Sambhu Lal Chakma, a Chakma singer and politician representing Chawmanu in the Tripura Legislative Assembly.
 Buddha Dhan Chakma, a politician representing Tuichawng in the Mizoram Legislative Assembly.
 Champa Chakma, a Bangladeshi cricketer who plays for the Bangladesh national women's cricket team.
 Monika Chakma, a Bangladesh women's U-19 midfield football player.
 Charu Bikash Chakma, a Bangladeshi Chakma politician.
  Rupna Chakma, a Bangladeshi Football Player